The men's singles luge competition at the 1994 Winter Olympics in Lillehammer was held on 13 and 14 February, at Lillehammer Olympic Bobsleigh and Luge Track.

Results

References

Luge at the 1994 Winter Olympics
Luge